The Light the Dead See is the fourth full-length studio album from English electronica production duo Soulsavers, released by V2 Records in the UK on 21 May 2012, and by Mute in the US on 22 May 2012. The album title comes from a poem by Frank Stanford. The album is a collaboration with Dave Gahan, the frontman of Depeche Mode, as guest vocalist. Gahan sings and wrote the lyrics on all non-instrumental songs on the album.

Release and promotion 
The album was released as CD and digital download on 21 May 2012. The LP version was delayed to 2 July 2012, due to quality problems in the vinyl pressing.

The first single taken from the album, "Longest Day", was released as digital download on 2 April 2012. A limited etched 7" vinyl version of the single, with only 300 copies pressed, was released on Record Store Day 20 April 2012.

The second single "Take Me Back Home" was released as digital download on 20 August 2012. An official music video was released from the track, directed by High 5 Collective. The video doesn't feature the artists themselves, but a story of life and loss.

Originally there were no plans to tour in support of the album, since Dave Gahan was going to the studio late March 2012 to start working on the next Depeche Mode record. However, the band played an invite-only "secret show" at Capitol Studios in Los Angeles on 21 July 2012. The full set of seven songs at Capitol was recorded and the 30-minute concert video "Live in Hollywood" has been streaming exclusively at the Rolling Stone website since 13 December 2012. According to Rich Machin, it will be available as a limited edition DVD in Europe early 2013.

Soulsavers premiered a music video for the track 'Take' . It was released on 28 February 2013 via Clash Music. The video was directed by filmmaker Bernhard Wittich.

Critical reception 
The album received generally positive reviews from music critics. At Metacritic, which assigns a normalized rating out of 100 to reviews from mainstream critics, the album received an average score of 73, based on 11 reviews, which indicates "generally favorable reviews".

David Von Bader in his review for Consequence of Sound stated, "The Light the Dead See is an album you listen to late at night, possibly in the dark, and absolutely alone. With a dash of Nick Cave and a shade of Scott Walker, the disc is a reminder of why Soulsavers’ atmospheric hymns work so well and have earned spots in countless film and television scores." Dave Simpson of The Guardian wrote, "Dave Gahan was a deep personal well of darkness: six minutes spent clinically dead following an overdose in 1996; a cancerous tumour in 2009. He draws on it extensively here... There's tenderness, too, but Gahan's brooding power is central to possibly his best work since Depeche's 1990 Violator: magnificent songs about demons and failings, morality and mortality, regret, faith and devotion." Hamish MacBain of NME added, "Dave Gahan (who provides all vocals here) and mainman Rich Machin have spoken about how much they have re-energised each other, and it shows. Initially it’s strange to hear that instantly identifiable baritone clashing with organic, rough-edged guitars, dirty Hammond organ, and delicate strings rather than the cold electronics of the day job, but it soon reveals itself to be a perfect pairing."

Track listing

Credits 
Musicians
 Dave Gahan: lead vocals, all lyrics; harmonica on tracks 11 12
 Rich Machin, Ian Glover (Soulsavers): all music
 Daniele Luppi: string arrangements on tracks 1 2 3 4 5 7 8 9
 Dustin O'Halloran: additional piano on track 11
 Kev Bales: additional drums on tracks 2 3 6 8 9 10 12
 Martyn LeNoble: additional bass on tracks 2 3 8 9 12; additional guitar on tracks 8 12
 Sean Read: additional organ on tracks 2 4 6 8 9 12
 Tony Foster; additional guitar on tracks 1 2 3 5 6 9 10 11 12; additional harmonica on track 1
 Ed Harcourt: additional harmonium & piano on track 3; additional guitar on track 12
 Mark Lanegan: backing vocals on track 2
 Wendi Rose, Janet Ramus; backing vocals on tracks 3 5 6 8 9 10 11
 Tjae Cole: backing vocals on 3 5 8 9 10
 Sonus Quartet: strings on tracks 1 2 3 4 5 7 8 9
 Anne Carruthers: cello on tracks 10 12
 Hannah Philip: violin on tracks 10 12
 Rosa Agostino: backing vocals on track 12
 Ben Edwards: flugel on tracks 3 & 9; trumpet on track 9
 Mike Kearsey: trombone on tracks 3 & 9

Production
 Produced by Soulsavers
 Mixed by Danton Supple & Soulsavers
 Mastered at Abbey Road Studios by Geoff Peche
 Recorded at:
 Sunset Sound, Selma Sound, 11AD – Los Angeles
 The Mouse House, Casa G, Mute hq, Strongrooms – UK
 Schlaf Klänge Studios – Berlin
 Studios 301 – Sydney
 Dave Gahan vocals recorded at Madpan Studios NYC & Blanco Studio NYC by Kurt Uenala
 Engineered by Kurt Uenala, David "Saxon" Greenep, Anton Riehl, Michael Morgan, Vincent Jones, Jay Marcovitz, Hannes Plattmeier, Alain Johannes, and Tony Foster

Charts

References

External links 
The Light the Dead See on Discogs

2012 albums
Soulsavers albums
Dave Gahan albums
V2 Records albums